Michael Schanze (born 15 January 1947 in Tutzing) is a German television presenter, actor and singer.

Life 
Schanze studied from 1967 to 1970 at University of Television and Film Munich. Schanze works as television presenter on German broadcasters. He is also a singer of Schlager songs. Schanze has been divorced since 2000 and has three sons.

Filmography

Television 
 1972: 'Hätten Sie heut Zeit für mich?
 1977–1985: 1, 2 oder 3
 1983: Start ins Glück (ARD)
 1985–1988: Telefant
 1988–1995: Flitterabend
 1989: Spiel ohne Grenzen
 Michael-Schanze-Show (ZDF)
 Wir warten auf's Christkind
 Showexpress
 Mobile
 Kinderquatsch mit Michael
 Nur keine Hemmungen
 Herzlichen Glückwunsch
 Telezirkus
 Wunderland

Films 
1971: Außer Rand und Band am Wolfgangsee, director: Franz Antel
1972: , director: Franz Antel
1972: Die lustigen Vier von der Tankstelle, director: Franz Antel
1983: Lass das – ich hass' das, director: Horst Hächler
2010: Dahoam is Dahoam (TV serie)

Songs 

1968: Ich bin kein Lord  and Es muss nicht Frühling sein
1970: Ich hab dich lieb
1971: Solang wir zwei uns lieben
1971: Wer dich sieht, hat dich lieb
1972: Oh wie wohl ist mir
1972: Sonntag im Zoo
1973: Wo du bist, will ich sein
1973: Ich lass dich nie mehr aus den Augen
1975: Du hast geweint
1975: Hell wie ein Diamant
1976: Nie mehr
1976: Es ist morgen und ich liebe dich noch immer
1977: Ich bin dein Freund
1978: Schalt mal dein Herz auf Empfang – Song of ARD-Fernsehlotterie
1978: Sonne scheint in alle Herzen
1982: Olé España (D #10) – together with Germany national football team
1982: Wie ich dich liebe

Awards 

 1973 – Bambi
 1975 – Bravo Otto in Bronze, category TV moderator
 1980 – Bambi
 1990 – Bambi
 1995 – Telestar Beste Moderation Unterhaltung for „Flitterabend“

External links 
 
 
 Michael Schanze Official Website

References 

German male singers
German game show hosts
Schlager musicians
1945 births
Living people
ZDF people